Route 105 or Highway 105 may refer to:

Argentina
 National Route 105
 La Pampa Provincial Route 105

Canada
 New Brunswick Route 105
 Nova Scotia Highway 105 (Trans-Canada Highway)
 Ontario Highway 105
 Prince Edward Island Route 105
 Quebec Route 105

China
 China National Highway 105
 S105 Nansha Port Expressway (Guangdong)

Costa Rica
 National Route 105

India
  National Highway 105 (India)

Japan
 Route 105 (Japan)

Philippines
 N105 highway (Philippines)

South Korea
 Namhae Expressway Branch 3

United States
 Interstate 105
 Alabama State Route 105
 Arkansas Highway 105
 Colorado State Highway 105
 Florida State Road 105
 Georgia State Route 105
 Georgia State Route 105 (1932–1937) (former)
 Illinois Route 105
 Indiana State Road 105
 Iowa Highway 105 (former)
 County Road 105 (Mitchell County, Iowa)
 County Road 105 (Worth County, Iowa)
 K-105 (Kansas highway)
 Kentucky Route 105
 Louisiana Highway 105
 Louisiana State Route 105 (former)
 Maine State Route 105
 Maryland Route 105 (former)
 Massachusetts Route 105
 M-105 (Michigan highway) (former)
 Minnesota State Highway 105
 Missouri Route 105
 Nebraska Highway 105
 County Route 105 (Bergen County, New Jersey)
 County Route 105 (Ocean County, New Jersey)
 New Mexico State Road 105
 New York State Route 105
 County Route 105 (Dutchess County, New York)
 County Route 105 (Erie County, New York)
 County Route 105 (Montgomery County, New York)
 County Route 105 (Nassau County, New York)
 County Route 105 (Niagara County, New York)
 County Route 105 (Onondaga County, New York)
 County Route 105 (Orange County, New York)
 County Route 105 (Seneca County, New York)
 County Route 105 (Steuben County, New York)
 County Route 105 (Suffolk County, New York)
 County Route 105 (Sullivan County, New York)
 County Route 105A (Sullivan County, New York)
 County Route 105 (Tompkins County, New York)
  North Carolina Highway 105
 Ohio State Route 105
 Oklahoma State Highway 105
 Pennsylvania Route 105 (former)
 South Carolina Highway 105
 South Dakota Highway 105 (former)
 Tennessee State Route 105
 Texas State Highway 105
 Texas State Highway Loop 105
 Texas State Highway Spur 105 (former)
 Farm to Market Road 105
 Utah State Route 105
 Vermont Route 105
 Vermont Route 105A
 Virginia State Route 105
 Washington State Route 105
 West Virginia Route 105
 Wisconsin Highway 105

Territories
 Puerto Rico Highway 105

See also
A105
B105 road
D105 road
P105
R105 road (Ireland)